Kostyantyn Eduardovych Shults (born 24 June 1993) is a Ukrainian professional footballer who plays as a defender for I Lyga side Džiugas Telšiai.

In 2017, he moved from FK Atlantas Klaipėda to FC Džiugas Telšiai. He spent five seasons at Džiugas, playing 128 games in the A Lyga and Pirma Lyga and scoring 13 goals. In December 2021 he left Džiugas but returned in May 2022.

References

External links
 
 
 Player stats on lietuvosfutbolas.lt

1993 births
Living people
Ukrainian footballers
Sportspeople from Kherson
Association football defenders
FC Chornomorets Odesa players
FC Chornomorets-2 Odesa players
FC Hirnyk-Sport Horishni Plavni players
FC Shirak players
FK Atlantas players
Ukrainian First League players
Ukrainian Second League players
Armenian Premier League players
Ukrainian expatriate footballers
Expatriate footballers in Armenia
Ukrainian expatriate sportspeople in Armenia
Expatriate footballers in Lithuania
Ukrainian expatriate sportspeople in Lithuania